(alternative spellings ,  or ) is a Welsh form of Celtic medieval football. The game originated in, and seems to have remained largely confined to, the western counties of Wales, especially Carmarthenshire, Ceredigion and Pembrokeshire. According to George Owen of Henllys, in his Description of Pembrokeshire (1603), cnapan had been "extremely popular in Pembrokeshire since greate ". Cnapan was one of the traditional ball games played to celebrate Shrovetide and Eastertide in the British Isles. These games were the forerunners of the codified football games first developed by Public Schools which led to the creation of Association football and Rugby football in the 19th century. Cnapan continued to be played until the rising popularity of Rugby Union Football resulted in the game falling into decline.

History
The earliest documented source for a group ball game in Great Britain comes from Wales. Historia Brittonum (The History of the Britons), written in the ninth century, depicts events after the end of Roman rule and forms the basis of the Arthurian legend. The book is accredited to Welsh monk and historian Nennius who supposedly had access to 5th century sources which have not survived. The preface, which appears in several recensions credited to Nennius, is considered by some historians to be a later embellishment by an anonymous writer. Others believe Historia Brittonum to be a collection of stories from the 7th century. Regardless of erroneous historical content, the main text does demonstrate that group ball games were understood in the 9th century and that the author of chapter 41 believed these games were played by the Britons. The oldest surviving transcript dates to c.1100 A.D.

 "In consequence of this reply, the king sent messengers throughout Britain, in search of a
child born without a father. After having inquired in all the provinces, they came to the 
 field of Ælecti, in the district of Glevesing, where a party of boys were playing at ball. And
two of them quarrelling, one said to the other, "O boy without a father, no good will ever
happen to you." Upon this, the messengers diligently inquired of the mother and the other
boys, whether he had had a father? Which his mother denied, saying, "In what manner he
was conceived I know not, for I have never had intercourse with any man;" and then she
solemnly affirmed that he had no mortal father. The boy was, therefore, led away, and
conducted before Vortigern the king." 

By the 4th century Britannia was divided into four provinces. The province of Britannia Prima extended its influence over what is now Wales and the West Country. The district of Glevesing referred to in the story is likely to be Colonia Nervia Glevensium founded as a Roman fort in the 1st century which later developed into a colony for retired legionaries. Some Latin inscriptions show this place name abbreviated to Glev'vm/Glevum. According to chapter 49 of Historia Brittonum it was here on the banks of the River Severn that the ancestors of King Vortigern founded the city of Gloucester (Brythonic name "Cair Gloui") where a medieval ball game is known to have been played. In Gloucester Cathedral, built in on the site of an abbey founded 678 or 679, a carved wooden relief on a misericord dated to the 14th century shows a scene from a "medieval football" game where two players are challenging for the ball. The small ball illustrated is more compatible in size to a Cnapan-type ball than the larger bladder inflated or stuffed ball used in similar mob games.
 An alternative theory is that the "district of Glevesing" was the 5th-century sub-Roman petty Kingdom of Glywysing named after the legendary Welsh King Glywys who probably took his name from the then demised Roman colony. Glywysing is located in modern day Glamorgan.

How the field sport recorded by Nennius relates to cnapan from the same region is unclear. Little information is known about the origins of cnapan, due to the age of the sport and the lack of historical records created for relatively inconsequential matters as playing ball games. It does seem to originate from the Middle Ages as a form of "organised chaos", to relieve the back-breaking monotonous work of daily life. George Owen of Henllys says, in his Description of Pembrokeshire (1603), that it had been a form of war training for the "Ancient Britons", used to improve strength and stamina. The game also seems to have evolved gradually over the years, with no definitive set of rules governing its play; but as the game is played with but a few simple rules, this has not been a major hindrance to play. Welsh clergyman and historian, Theophilus Evans (1693–1767), tells of a game similar to cnapan being played on the banks of the River Teifi; the ancient boundary between the counties of Ceredigion and Carmarthenshire, southwest Wales. Leaving aside the gentry on horseback, there were certainly two groups of players on each side, some who grappled for the cnapan (ball) and others who were the fastest and most elusive runners.  There were also features approximating to scrummages and line-outs. The game died out in the nineteenth century, as the codified game of rugby union became popular.

The game was recreated, for about ten years, in Newport, Pembrokeshire around 1985–95, with an annual contest between Newport Parish and Nevern Parish, with much smaller sides and a referee to keep order. The "Cnapan Trophy" still exists.  The tournament was eventually abandoned by the organizers when they could not obtain insurance coverage for the players.

Rules of play
Cnapan was played with large numbers of people from two neighbouring parishes (usually involving the male population of the two participating parishes), and a solid wooden ball probably a little larger than a cricket ball. The day before the game, the ball was soaked or boiled for at least 12 hours (and usually overnight) in oil, animal fat, or any other commonly available lubricant; this was done to make the ball more difficult to catch and hold on to, and to make play more unpredictable. The ball could be passed, smuggled or thrown for considerable distances.

The object of the game was to take the ball to the church of one's home parish using any means possible; however the game was not usually completed with a "goal", as the majority of the opposing players usually gave up when the ball was moved sufficiently inside a team's parish as to render a win for the opposing parish unlikely. Sometimes darkness intervened before a conclusion. Other games were played on Traeth Mawr (Big Beach) at the mouth of the Nevern River, with the "Newport end" and the "Nevern end" of the beach serving as the "goals".

No written rules for the game of Cnapan have yet been found, but the rules were known to the players. Each team would have "sturdy gamesmen" who would have been the equivalent of the forwards in modern rugby, and then others who were elusive and fleet of foot, equivalent to modern threequarters.  There were extended and chaotic scrummages, which would only be stopped at the cry of "Heddwch!" ("Peace!") to avoid injury and so that the game could be restarted and moved along.  The restarts involved hurling the ball high into the air, presumably to be caught in a sort of line-out.  Labourers and peasants played on foot, but members of the gentry played on horseback.  Injuries were therefore common, and deaths sometimes occurred during the cnapan contests. Despite this, when games were organised, there might be up to a thousand men in each team (as is described in the extract below).

The nature of the game is described at length by George Owen of Henllys (1552–1613), an eccentric historian of Pembrokeshire:

"This game is called and not unfitly as shall be showed, the game is thought to be of great antiquity and is as followeth. The ancient Britons being naturally a warlike nation did no doubt for the exercise of their youth in time of peace and to avoid idleness devise games of activity where each man might show his natural prowess and agility, as some for strength of the body by wrestling, lifting of heavy burdens, others for the arm as in casting the bar, sledge, stone, or hurling the bawl or ball, others that excelled in swiftness of foot, to win the praise therein by running, and surely for the exercise of the parts aforesaid this cnapan was prudently invented, had the same continued without abuse thereof. For in it, beside the exercise of the bodily strength, it is not without resemblance of warlike providence, as shall be hereafter declared, and first before I describe you the play, I will let you know that this cnapan happens and falls out maybe by two means. The one is a settled or standing cnapan the date and place being known and yearly haunted and observed: of these cnapan days in Pembrokeshire there were wont to be five in number, the first at Bury sands between the parishes of Nevern and Newport upon Shrove Tuesday yearly; the second at Portheinon, on Easter Monday, between the parishes of Meline and Eglwyswrw; the third on low Easterday at Pwll-du in Penbedw between the parishes Penrhydd and Penbedw; the fourth and fifth were wont to be at St. Meigans in Cemais between Cemais men of the one party, and Emlyn men, and the men of Cardiganshire with them of the other party, the first upon Ascension Day, the other upon Corpus Christi day, and these two last were the great and main places, far exceeding any of the former in multitude of people for at these places there have oftentimes been esteemed two thousand foot beside horsemen...

...About one or two of the clock afternoon begins the play, in this sort, after a cry made both parties draw to into some plain, all first strip bare saving a light pair of breeches, bare-headed, bare-bodied, bare legs and feet: for if he leave but his shirt on his back in the fury of the game, it is most commonly torn to pieces and I have also seen some long-lock gallants, trimly trimmed at this game not by clipping but by pulling their hair and beards.

The foot company thus meeting, there is a round ball prepared of a reasonable quantity so as a man may hold it in his hand and no more, this ball is of some massy wood as box, yew, crab or holly tree and should be boiled in tallow for to make it slippery and hard to hold. This ball is called cnapan and is by one of the company hurling bolt upright into the air, and at the fall he that catches it hurls it towards the country he plays for, for goal or appointed place there is none neither needs any, for the play is not given over until the cnapan be so far carried that there is no hope to return it back that night, for the carrying of it a mile or two miles from the first place is no losing of the honour so it be still followed by the company and the play still maintained, it is oftentimes seen the chase to follow two miles and more. It is a strange sight to see a thousand or fifteen hundred naked men to concur together in a cluster in following the cnapan as the same is hurled backward and forward."

The game today
The game is no longer played, mainly because of the serious injuries which might result from playing the game in its original form, but also because insurance for the players of an "unrecognized game" is very expensive indeed.  However, the annual contests between Newport and Nevern Parishes in 1985–95 (with modified rules) were greatly enjoyed by local youngsters, with no serious injuries.  At the Gateshead Garden Festival there was a Cnapan International between England and Wales.  Wales won easily, partly because the English team did not know the rules.

Despite the game's discontinuation, the legacy of the game can be seen in some places where it was previously played – an example being the "Cnapan Hotel" in Newport, Pembrokeshire.

A similar game, known as hyrlian, is still played with a silver ball in Cornwall.

Further reading
Further details about the game can be found in Brian John's book The Ancient Game of Cnapan, and there is a description of a cnapan match in the novel House of Angels.

References

Ball games
Traditional football
Sport in Wales
Sports originating in Wales